Marki  is a city in central Poland, just to the north-east of the Polish capital Warsaw.

Marki, a Warsaw suburb, was incorporated in 1967. While by Polish standards Marki is a relatively young town, with approximately 31,000 residents, it is one of the fastest-growing cities in the Masovian province. Marki consists of three districts: Marki proper, Pustelnik, and Struga. Each district has its own post office, with an assigned zip code.

Marki has been long associated with industry, and while manufacturing still takes place, the service sector is booming. Marki has an extensive public education system served with six elementary schools, two preschools, and high school/trade school. While there is currently no hospital, there are a few public and private clinics available to the residents of the town.

Geography

Marki is surrounded by forests, and pastures. Tourist attractions include numerous man-made ponds, lakes, and hiking trails. Marki is home to two hotels, one in Marki and one in Struga. North-east of Marki, there is a 100-metre high mast used for radio relay links by Telekomunikacja Polska and Centertel.

History

On Christmas Eve of 1909, Lithuanian painter and composer Mikalojus Konstantinas Čiurlionis fell into a profound depression and at the beginning of 1910 was hospitalized in a psychiatric hospital "Czerwony Dwór" (Red Manor) in Pustelnik, now incorporated into Marki. While a patient there he died of pneumonia in 1911 at 35 years of age. A plaque on the side of this building commemorates the passing of one of the most influential figures of modern Lithuanian culture.

Transport

The Marecka Kolej Dojazdowa was a narrow gauge railway in Poland connecting Warsaw with Marki and Radzymin active from 1896 to 1974.
Nowadays Marki are conntected with Warsaw by several number of ZTM bus lines

Gallery

See also
Horowe Bagno Nature Reserve

References

External links 
  
 Jewish Community in Marki on Virtual Shtetl

Cities and towns in Masovian Voivodeship
Wołomin County